Johanna Hohloch  (born 23 February 1964) is a television actress.

In 1993 she appeared in the Austrian comedy series Hochwürden erbt das Paradies.

External links

1964 births
Living people
Actors from Salzburg
Austrian television actresses